In finance, an option on realized variance (or variance option) is a type of variance derivatives which is the derivative securities on which the payoff depends on the annualized realized variance of the return of a specified underlying asset, such as stock index, bond, exchange rate, etc. Another liquidated security of the same type is variance swap, which is, in other words, the futures contract on realized variance.

With a similar notion to the vanilla options, variance options give the owner a right but without obligation to buy or sell the realized variance in exchange with some agreed price (variance strike) sometime in the future (expiry date), except that risk exposure is solely subjected to the price's variance itself. This property gains interest among traders since they can use it as an instrument to speculate the future movement of the asset volatility to, for example, delta-hedge a portfolio, without taking a directional risk of possessing the underlying asset.

Definitions
In practice, the annualized realized variance is defined by the sum of the square of discrete-sampling log-return of the specified underlying asset.

where

 is the options expiry date which is equal to the number 

If one puts

 to be a variance strike and
 be a notional amount converting the payoffs into a unit amount of money, say, e.g., USD or GBP,

and

respectively.

Note that the annualized realized variance can also be defined through continuous sampling, which resulted in the quadratic variation of the underlying price. That is, if we suppose that  determines the instantaneous volatility of the price process, then

defines the continuous-sampling annualized realized variance which is also proved to be the limit in the probability of the discrete form i.e.

.

However, this approach is only adopted to approximate the discrete one since the contracts involving realized variance are practically quoted in terms of the discrete sampling.

Pricing and valuation
Suppose that under a risk-neutral measure  the underlying asset price  solves the time-varying Black–Scholes model as follows:

 

where:
 is (time varying) risk-free interest rate,
 is (time varying) price volatility, and

ฺBy this setting, in the case of variance call, its fair price at time  denoted by  can be attained by the expected present value of its payoff function i.e.

where  for the discrete sampling while  for the continuous sampling. And by put-call parity we also get the put value once  is known.

See also
Variance swap
Volatility swap
Volatility (finance)

References

Derivatives (finance)
Options (finance)
Statistical deviation and dispersion